Dam Gerow Band (also known as Pāzhnān) is a village in Isin Rural District, in the Central District of Bandar Abbas County, Hormozgan Province, Iran. At the 2006 census, its population was 30, in 8 families.

References 

Populated places in Bandar Abbas County